The 1982 World's Strongest Man was the sixth edition of World's Strongest Man and was won by Bill Kazmaier from the United States. It was his third title in a row. Tom Magee from Canada finished second and John Gamble from the United States finished third. The contest was held at the Magic Mountain in California.

The World's Strongest Man was held in the United States for the sixth consecutive year; the competition did not return there until 1997.

Events
There were ten events in the competition:
 Truck pull – winner: Bill Kazmaier 37 s (Notable that Geoff Capes improved time from 46 s to 38 s by moving to Kazmaier's lane.)
 Overhead log lift (rough-hewn log) – winner: Bill Kazmaier 370lbs
 Weight toss (56lbs weight over bar throw) – winner: Bill Kazmaier 17 feet
 Steel bar bend – winner: Geoff Capes (only one to bend 11/16" to 5 inch distance)
 Caber toss – winner: Dave Waddington 40'3"
 Barrel load (12 barrels each 167 lbs.) – winner: Tom Magee 73 s 
 Battery hold (65 lbs. at arm's length) – winner: John Gamble 56.7 s
 Cement block squat (Smith machine squat) – tie: Tom Magee, Ernie Hackett, and Dave Waddington 955 lbs.
 Silver dollar deadlift (18" off the floor with straps allowed) tie: Bill Kazmaier and Ernie Hackett 1055lbs
 Sumo challenge – winner: Curt Marsh

Final results

Source: theworldsstrongestman.com

References

External links
 Official website

World's Strongest
World's Strongest Man
1982 in sports in California